Administratively, Damascus Governorate, one of Syria's 14 governorates, is divided into two cities: the city of Damascus and the city of Yarmouk. The city of Damascus is divided into 16 municipalities. Every municipal district is managed by an elected mayor, which in turn is divided into 95 districts (Arabic: الحي hayy), each headed by a mayor, and they all participate in the election of the Damascus city council. Yarmouk is one whole municipality, and is divided into 6 neighborhoods.

Municipalities of Damascus Governorate

See also
Districts of Syria
Governorates of Syria

References

Damascus